Bastos is a municipality in the state of São Paulo in Brazil. The population is 20,953 (2020 est.) in an area of 172 km2.

History
The name originated from Henrique Bastos, who owned a farm in the area. And it was these same lands that the foundation of the city occurred on June 18, 1928, by Senjiro Hatanaka, sent by the Japanese government to look for land to receive the waves of Japanese immigrants.

After cycles of crops such as coffee, cotton, sericulture, from 1957, the council found its economic vocation: the laying poultry. The city has the largest flock of laying hens in the country and thus is the municipality with the highest production of eggs from Brazil, so the self-titling of "capital of the egg." Bastos is also the headquarters of the Brazilian city of the Egg Festival. This festival brings together not only an exhibition of innovations and products used in the poultry industry, as well as concerts and entertainment for the general population and the region of Bastos.

Geography

Demographics

Census Data - 2000

Total Population : 20,588

 Urban: 17,040
 Rural: 3548
 Male: 10,247
 Female: 10,341

Population density (inhabitants / km ²): 120.82

Infant mortality by 1 year (per thousand): 8.78

Life expectancy (years): 75.55

Fertility rate (children per woman): 2.06

Literacy Rate : 90.20%

Human Development Index (HDI): 0.798

 HDI-M Income: 0.693
 HDI-M Longevity: 0.843
 HDI-M Education: 0.859

(Source: IPEA DATA)

Ethnic groups
Source: 2000 census:

References

Municipalities in São Paulo (state)
Populated places established in 1928
Japanese-Brazilian culture